Heinrich Appelt (born 25 June 1910 in Vienna, d. 16 September 1998 in Vienna) was an Austrian historian.

Works 
 Die Urkundenfälschungen des Klosters Trebnitz. Studien zur Verfassungsentwicklung der deutschrechtlichen Klosterdörfer und zur Entstehung des Dominiums. Breslau 1940 (Veröffentlichungen der Historischen Kommission für Schlesien 2; Forschgen. z. schles. Urkundenbuch 2).
 Das Diplom Kaiser Heinrichs II. für Göss vom 1. Mai 1020. Eine diplomatisch-verfassungsgeschtliche Untersuchung. Mit einem Faksimile der Urkunde. Graz u.a. 1953.
 Die Kaiseridee Friedrich Barbarossas. Wien 1967 (SÖAW-PH 252/2).
 Privilegium minus. Das staufische Kaisertum und die Babenberger in Österreich. Wien, Köln u. Graz 1973 (Böhlau Quellenbücher), 2. Aufl. 1976.
Kaisertum, Königtum, Landesherrschaft. Wien, Köln u. Graz 1988 (Mitteilungen des Instituts für Österreichische Geschichtsforschung, Beih. 28) (Zusammenstellung seiner Aufsätze).
Regesta imperii, Neubearbeitung. Serie III, Salisches Haus 1024–1125, hg. v. Heinrich Appelt, III,1: Die Regesten des Kaiserreiches unter Konrad II. 1024–1039, Graz 1951.

References 
 Fritz Fellner, Doris A. Corradini: Österreichische Geschichtswissenschaft im 20. Jahrhundert. Ein biographisch-bibliographisches Lexikon. Böhlau, Wien 2006, p. 40–41. 
 Othmar Hageneder: "Nachruf Heinrich Appelt". In: Mitteilungen des Instituts für Österreichische Geschichtsforschung. 107, 1999, p.507–511.
 Walter Koch: "Nachruf Heinrich Appelt". In: Deutsches Archiv für Erforschung des Mittelalters. 55, 1999, p. 413–415. (on-line)
 Winfried Stelzer: "Heinrich Appelt †". In: Othmar Pickl (Hrsg.): 25. Bericht der Historischen Landeskommission für Steiermark. 2000, p. 23–28.
 Jens Thiel: "Gab es eine „nationalsozialistische“ Akademikergeneration? Hochschullehrerlaufbahnen und generationelle Prägungen in Deutschland und Österreich 1933/38 bis 1945". In: Zeitgeschichte. Band 35, 2008, p. 230–256 (for Appelt p. 242–244).

20th-century Austrian historians
1910 births
1998 deaths
20th-century Austrian male writers